Earl Lawson may refer to:

 Earl Lawson (politician) (1891–1950), Canadian politician
 Earl Lawson (sportswriter) (1923–2003), American sportswriter